Nada Rocco (born 15 September 1947) is a Croatian actress.

Filmography

Television roles

Movie roles

References

External links
 

1947 births
Living people
Croatian actresses
Croatian stage actresses
Croatian television actresses
Croatian film actresses
Actresses from Zagreb